Ric Esther Bienstock  is a Canadian documentary filmmaker best known for her investigative documentaries. She was born in Montreal, Quebec and studied at Vanier College and McGill University. She has produced and directed an eclectic array of films from investigative social issue documentaries like Sex Slaves, an investigation into the trafficking of women from former Soviet Bloc Countries into the global sex trade and Ebola: Inside an Outbreak which took viewers to ground zero of the Ebola outbreak in Zaire - to lighter fare such as Penn & Teller’s Magic and Mystery Tour.

She was the 2015 recipient of the prestigious Gordon Sinclair Award for Broadcast Journalism from the Canadian Academy of Cinema and Television and was honoured with the Birks Diamond Tribute to the Year's Women in Film at the 2014 Toronto International Film Festival.

She has garnered dozens of awards for her films including a U.S. Emmy for Outstanding Investigative Journalism, two Edward R. Murrow Awards, an Alfred I. Dupont-Columbia Award for Excellence in Broadcast Journalism , a Scripps Howard Award for International Reporting, 2 Geminis, a Genie, a British Broadcast Award, a Royal Television Society Award, an Overseas Press Club of America Award, a Gracie Award, 2 Cine Golden Eagles, 2 Gold Hugos, a Distinguished Documentary Achievement Award from the IDA, 2 Hot Docs Awards, a Gold Worldmedia Award, 2 Amnesty International Awards, 3 Canadian Screen Awards including the Donald Brittain Award for Best Social Issue Documentary and a Cable Ace Award among others. She was also nominated for a BAFTA in the U.K.

Filmography
 AIDS in Africa (1990)
 Burden on the Land (1990)
 Deadly Currents  (1991)
 Hurry Up and Wait (1992)
 The Plague Monkeys (1994)
 Ms. Conceptions (1995)
 Ebola: Inside an Outbreak (1996)
 The Money Shot (1999)
 Penn & Teller's Magic and Mystery Tour (2000)
 Boxing: In and Out of the Ring (2001)
 Genius Sperm Bank (2003)
 Impact of Terror (2004)
 Sex Slaves (2006)
 The Lost Tomb of Jesus (2007)
 Beasts of the Bible (2010)
 Finding Atlantis (2011)
 Lost Faces of the Bible (2012)
 The Age of Anxiety (2012)
 Tales from the Organ Trade (2013)
 The Accountant of Auschwitz (2018)
 Enslaved (2020)

Awards
Tales From the Organ Trade
 Edward R. Murrow Award - Overseas Press Club of America 
 Emmy Award nomination for Outstanding Investigative Journalism
 Emmy Award nomination for Outstanding Writing
 Scripps Howard, Jack R. Howard Award for International Coverage
 Norman Bethune Award for Excellence in International Health Reporting 
 Global Awareness Award, WorldMediaFestival, Germany
 Gold Award, WorldMediaFestival, Germany
 Golden Eagle Award for Investigative Reporting
 Golden Sheaf Award for Best Social/Political, Yorkton Film Festival
 Best "Sign of the Times" - Documentary Edge Festival, New Zealand
 Best Feature Length Film - Docutah
 Best Director - Docutah
 Best Feature Documentary - Tenerife International Film Festival
 Special Jury Award - Nevada International Film Festival
 Honourable Mention - Ojai International Film Festival
The Age of Anxiety
 Banff Rockie Award (2013)
Finding Atlantis
 2012 Silver World Medal in the "History and Society" category at New York Festivals
 2011 International Golden Panda Nomination at Sichuan TV Festival 
 2011 Gemini Nomination for "Best History Documentary Program"
Beasts of the Bible 
 2011 Banff Rockie Awards nomination in "Wildlife & Natural History Program" category
 2011 Intermedia-Globe Silver Award in "Nature & Wildlife" category at World Media Festival
 2011 Silver Plaque Special Achievement for "Animation/Computer Graphics" at HUGO TV Awards
 2011 Finalist Award Winner at New York Festivals
 2011 CINE Golden Eagle Award
 2011 History Makers Awards Nomination for "Most Innovative Program"
The Lost Tomb of Jesus 
 2008 Gold World Medal at New York Festivals
Sex Slaves 
 2007 Emmy Award in the category of "Outstanding Investigative Journalism"
 2007 Overseas Press Club Edward R. Murrow Award in the category of "Best TV interpretation or documentary on international affairs"
 2007 Mission Award at the Woman’s International Film Festival
 2006 Gemini Nomination for "Best Writing"
 2006 BAFTA Nomination for "Best Single Documentary"
 2006 British Broadcast Award in the category of "Best Documentary Programme"
 2006 UK Royal Television Society Award
 2006 Gracie Award for Outstanding Documentary in New York
 2006 Best of the Festival at the U.N. Documentary Film Festival
 2006 Bulldog Award for "Best Documentary" at Televisual Magazine, U.K.
 2006 Silver Award at the Worldmedia Festival, Hamburg, Germany
 2006 Shortlisted for the Prix Italia, Venice, Italy
 2006 Shortlisted for the Prix Europa, Berlin, Germany
Impact of Terror 
 2006 Grand Award at New York Festivals
 2006 Gold World Medal at New York Festivals
 2005 Overseas Press Club of America Award
Penn & Teller’s Magic and Mystery Tour
 2001 Gold Award at the Worldmedia Festival in Hamburg, Germany
The Money Shot
 2001 Silver Plaque at the Chicago International Television Festival
Ebola: Inside an Outbreak 
 1997 Gemini Award for "Best Science Documentary"
 1997 Gemini Award for "Best Science Score"
 1997 "Best Science Documentary" Hot Docs Canadian International documentary film festival
 1996 Alfred I. Dupont - Columbia University Award for "TV Journalism"
 1996 Gold Plaque at the Chicago International Television Festival
 1996 "Best Achievement in Documentaries" at the Monitor Awards
 1996 "First Place Freddie Award" from the American Medical Association
 1996 "Chris Award" at the Columbus International Film Festival
Ms. Conceptions 
 1996 Gemini Award for "Donald Brittain Award for Best Documentary"
 1996 Gold Plaque at the Chicago Film Festival
 1996 Silver Apple from the National Educational Media Network
 1995 Distinguished Documentary Achievement Award from IDA Association, Los Angeles
The Plague Monkeys 
 1996 Emmy Award
 1995 CableAce Award for "Best Documentary"
 1995 Gemini Award
 1995 Gold Special Jury Award at the Houston International Film Festival
 1995 Gold Apple from the National Educational Media Network
 1995 "Chris Award" at the Columbus International Film Festival
 1995 Silver Hugo at the Chicago International Film & Video Festival
Deadly Currents 
 1994 CableAce Award for "Best International Documentary Special"
 1992 Genie Award for "Best Feature Documentary"
 1992 Gold Hugo at the Chicago International Film Festival
 1992 Gold Award at the Houston International Film Festival
 1992 Nominated for "Peace Prize" at the Berlin Film Festival
 1991 Grand Prix at the Nyon International Documentary Festival
 1991 "Chris Award" at the Columbus International Film Festival
Hurry Up and Wait
 1995 Silver Medal at Prix Leonardo, Italy
 1994 Gold Award at the Houston International Film Festival
 1993 Silver Hugo for "Best Direction" Medicine, Chicago
 1993 Bronze Medal at the International Film & TV Festival of New York
 1993 Certificate of Merit at Intercom, Chicago
 1993 Honorable Mention at the Columbus International Film Festival
Burden on the Land 
 1991 Silver Medal at the Houston International Film Festival
 1991 Red Ribbon Award at the American Film Festival
 1991 Silver Screen Award at the U.S. Film & Video Festival
AIDS in Africa
 1990 Gold Hugo at the Chicago International Film Festival
 1990 First Place Gold at the John Muir Film Festival, 1990
 1990 Gold Hugo at the Chicago Film Festival
 1990 Silver Medal at the International Film & TV Festival of New York
 1990 Bronze Plaque at the Columbus International Film Festival

References

Bibliography

External links 
 Good Soup Productions Inc. 
 Associated Producers Ltd. - Ric Esther Bienstock
 
 The New York Times - Today's Slave Traders, Named Olga and Vlad
 The New York Times - Boxing: In & Out of the Ring
 The Edward R. Murrow Award (2006 OPC Award Winners) - Sex Slaves
 Media Communications Association International - Stories from the Field
 Ryerson Review of Journalism - Ethical Dilemma
 Official PBS Site for Sex Slaves
 McGill Alumni Portal - Ric Esther Bienstock & Simcha Jacobovici
 Washington Post - PBS Frontline: 'Sex Slaves'
 Age of Anxiety

Canadian documentary film directors
Film directors from Montreal
Living people
Canadian women film directors
Canadian women film producers
Canadian documentary film producers
McGill University alumni
Year of birth missing (living people)
Officers of the Order of Canada
Canadian Screen Award winning journalists
Canadian television directors
Canadian women television directors
Canadian women documentary filmmakers